Leonard L. Jones was an American architect.

Career
Jones was originally based in San Francisco, relocating to Los Angeles between 1912 and 1923. At varying times, his offices were situated in the Isaias W. Hellman Building in Downtown Los Angeles, the Pacific Electric Building, and the Gross Building.

Works
Edmund J. Beck Residence, 2520 Chislehurst Pl., Los Angeles (1941)
456 N. Curson Ave., Los Angeles (1937)
Irving P. Krick Residence, 3634 Shannon Rd., Los Feliz, Los Angeles (1936)
Frank Williams Residence, 2015 N. Edgemont St., Los Feliz, Los Angeles (1935)
The Hermoyne Apartments, 569 South Rossmore Ave. (1929)
Castle Argyle Arms, 1919 Argyle Ave., West Hollywood (1928)
1825 N. Kingsley Dr., Los Angeles (1927)
2420 N. Canyon Dr., Hollywood (1926)
Norton Flats, North Norton Avenue, Los Angeles (1924-1926)
1615 Normandie Ave., Los Angeles (1923)
2260 N. Edgemont St., Los Angeles (1921)

References

20th-century American architects
Architects from San Francisco
Architects from Los Angeles